Margaret Moore is a Canadian author of romance novels.

Biography
The USA Today bestselling author of over 40 historical romance novels and novellas, Margaret Moore graduated with distinction from the University of Toronto with a degree in English literature.  She sold her first book, A Warrior's Heart, to Harlequin Historicals in 1991.  She has also sold historical romances to Avon Books and a Young Adult historical romance to HarperCollins Children's Books.

Moore has been a Romantic Times Book reviews finalist for Career Achievement in Medieval Historical Romance, won an award for Best Foreign Historical from Affaire de Coeur, and two of her characters have received K.I.S.S. (Knights in Shining Silver) Awards from Romantic Times Book reviews. In 2005 her medieval romance The Unwilling Bride made the USA Today bestseller list. The sequel, Hers To Command, was nominated for a Reviewers' Choice award by SingleTitles.com. Publishers Weekly reviewed it as " touching but predictable romance," though it praised the details of life in the era.  

She is also a past president of Toronto Romance Writers.

Works
 A Warrior's Heart – 1992 (Harlequin Historical)
 China Blossom – 1992 (Harlequin Historical)
 A Warrior's Quest – 1993 (Harlequin Historical)
 The Viking – 1993 (Harlequin Historical) – Winner Best Foreign Historical of 1993 from Affaire de Coeur
 A Warrior's Way – 1994 (Harlequin Historical)
 Vows – 1994 (Harlequin Historical)
 The Saxon – 1995 (Harlequin Historical)
 The Welshman's Way – 1995 (Harlequin Historical)
 The Norman's Heart – 1995 (Harlequin Historical)
 The Baron's Quest – 1996 (Harlequin Historical)
 The Wastrel – 1996 (Harlequin Historical)
 The Dark Duke – 1997 (Harlequin Historical)
 The Rogue's Return – 1997 (Harlequin Historical) – Winner of Romantic Times KISS Award
 A Warrior’s Bride – 1998 (Harlequin Historical)
 A Warrior’s Honor – 1998 (Harlequin Historical)
 A Warrior’s Passion – 1998 (Harlequin Historical)
 A Scoundrel's Kiss – 1999 (Avon Books)
 The Welshman's Bride – 1999 (Harlequin Historical)
 A Rogue's Embrace – 2000 (Avon Books)
 A Warrior’s Kiss – 2000 (Harlequin Historical)
 The Duke's Desire – 2000 (Harlequin Historical)
 His Forbidden Kiss – 2001 (Avon Books)
 The Overlord's Bride – 2001 (Harlequin Historical)
 The Maiden And Her Knight – 2001 (Avon Books)
 Tempt Me With Kisses – 2002 (Avon Books)
 Gwyneth And The Thief – 2002 (HarperCollins Children's Books) – Young Adult
 A Warrior’s Lady – 2002 (Harlequin Historical)
 All My Desire – 2002 (Avon Books)
 Kiss Me Quick – 2003 (Avon Books)
 In The King's Service – 2003 (Harlequin Historical)
 Kiss Me Again – 2004 (Avon Books)
 Bride Of Lochbarr – 2004 (HQN Books)
 Lord Of Dunkeathe – 2005 (HQN Books)
 The Unwilling Bride – 2005 (HQN Books) – USA Today Bestseller
 Hers To Command – 2006 (HQN Books)
 Hers To Desire – 2006 (HQN Books)
 My Lord's Desire – 2007 (HQN Books)
 The Notorious Knight – 2007 (HQN Books)
 Knave's Honor – 2008 (HQN Books)

Novellas
 "Christmas in the Valley" in Mistletoe Marriages, 1994, (Harlequin)
 "The Twelfth Day of Christmas" in The Knights Of Christmas, 1997, (Harlequin Historical)
 "The Vagabond Knight" in The Brides Of Christmas, 1999, reissued 2005 (Harlequin)
 "Comfort and Joy" in The Christmas Visit, 2004, (Harlequin Historical)

Books by series

The Warrior series
Harlequin Historical, Medieval Britain
 A Warrior’s Heart – 1992
 A Warrior’s Quest – 1993
 A Warrior’s Way – 1994
 The Welshman's Way – 1995
 The Norman's Heart – 1995
 The Baron's Quest – 1996
 A Warrior’s Bride – 1998
 A Warrior’s Honor – 1998
 A Warrior’s Passion – 1998
 The Welshman's Bride – 1999
 A Warrior’s Kiss – 2000
 The Overlord's Bride – 2001
 A Warrior’s Lady – 2002
 In The King's Service – 2003

The Viking series
Harlequin Historical, Dark Age Britain
 The Viking – 1993
 The Saxon – 1995

Victorian series
The Most Unsuitable Men
 The Wastrel – 1996
 The Dark Duke – 1997
 The Rogue's Return – 1997

Restoration series
Avon Books
 A Scoundrel's Kiss – 1999
 A Rogue's Embrace – 2000
 His Forbidden Kiss – 2001

Avon Medieval series
Avon Books
 The Maiden And Her Knight – 2001
 Tempt Me With Kisses – 2002
 All My Desire – 2002

Regency series
Avon Books
 Kiss Me Quick – 2003
 Kiss Me Again – 2004

Brothers-in-Arms series
HQN Books, Medieval Scotland and England
 Bride Of Lochbarr – 2004
 Lord Of Dunkeathe – 2005
 The Unwilling Bride – 2005
 Hers To Command – 2006
 Hers To Desire – 2006

King John series
HQN Books, Medieval Britain
 My Lord's Desire – 2007
 The Notorious Knight – 2007
 Knave's Honor – 2008

References

External links 
 Margaret Moore
Archive Material at Leeds University Library
 Margaret Moore's Blog

Canadian romantic fiction writers
Living people
Canadian historical novelists
Writers of historical fiction set in the Middle Ages
Writers of historical romances
Year of birth missing (living people)
Canadian women novelists
Women romantic fiction writers
Women historical novelists